Aryal (also written as Arjel, Ariyal) is a Nepali surname. In Hinduism, they are believed to be the descendants of Sage Atreya. Varaha is the deity of the Aryal clan. Aryals belong to the Atreya(descendant of Atri rishi) gotra. 
 Aryals played an important role during the unification of Nepal.

Notable people with surname Aryal

 Bhairav Aryal, Nepali essayist
 Krishna Raj Aryal, foreign minister of Nepal
 Prakash Aryal, Inspector General of Police 
 Prashant Aryal, Nepalese journalist
 Upendra Kant Aryal, Nepalese Inspector General of Police
 Urmila Aryal, Nepalese Communist politician
 Padma Kumari Aryal, Minister for Land Management, Cooperatives and Poverty Alleviation of Nepalan Rights Activist, political pundit
 Shakti Ballav Aryal, Nepalese writer3
 Ritesh Aryal,

References 

Nepali-language surnames
Khas surnames
Surnames of Nepalese origin